Pterophorus ceraunia is a moth of the family Pterophoridae. It is known from the Democratic Republic of Congo.

It is mostly white with distinct black fringe markings.

The larvae feed on Merremia hederacea and Oldenlandia corymbosa.

References

ceraunia
Insects of the Democratic Republic of the Congo
Moths of Africa
Moths described in 1969
Endemic fauna of the Democratic Republic of the Congo